Hjuksebø Station is a former railway station on the Sørland Line and the Bratsberg Line, located at Hjuksebø in Sauherad, Norway.

References

Railway stations in Vestfold og Telemark
Railway stations on the Sørlandet Line
Railway stations on the Bratsberg Line
Railway stations opened in 1917
1917 establishments in Norway
Disused railway stations in Norway
Year of disestablishment missing